Rock Falls may refer to a place in the United States:

 Rock Falls, Illinois
 Rock Falls, Iowa
 Rock Falls, Wisconsin, a town in Lincoln County
 Rock Falls, Dunn County, Wisconsin, an unincorporated community in Dunn County
 Rock Falls Township, Holt County, Nebraska
 Industry-Rock Falls Township, Phelps County, Nebraska